Nanbargal is a 1991 Indian Tamil-language romance film directed by Shoba Chandrasekhar. It stars Neeraj and Mamta Kulkarni, with Vivek, Dinesh, G. M. Sundar and Shily Kapoor in supporting roles. It was produced by Vijay. Its songs were composed by Babul Bose, and the score was composed by Sangeetha Rajan. It did well at the box-office and was later remade in Hindi as Mera Dil Tere Liye by S. A. Chandrasekhar, which flopped.

Plot 

Vijay, Gopi, Salim, Beeda and Bheema are good friends and classmates. Priya, a rich and arrogant girl, has first quarrels with Vijay. Vijay first loved her, but she ridicules him and hurts him. When his friends try to teach a lesson to Priya, Vijay saves her and they both fall in love. Priya's father, an influential businessman, is ready to break their relationship.

Cast 
Neeraj as Vijay
Mamta Kulkarni as Priya
Vivek as Gopi
Dinesh as Salim
G. M. Sundar as Beeda
Shily Kapoor as Bheema
Nagesh as Rajasekhar
Manorama
Prathapachandran as Priya's father
Sangeeta as Priya's mother
Vennira Aadai Moorthy as Sidambaram (guest appearance)
Ajay Rathnam
Kumarimuthu

Soundtrack 
The soundtrack was composed by Babul Bose, with lyrics written by Vairamuthu and Pulamaipithan.

Reception 
N. Krishnaswamy of The Indian Express wrote, "The film has a swift pace, some interesting characters, a lot of fun whipped by the hero's sidekicks [...] and fastpaced music (new entrant Babu Bose), but what is film music these days but canned cacophony."

References

External links 
 

1990s Tamil-language films
1991 films
1991 romance films
Films scored by Babul Bose
Indian romance films
Tamil films remade in other languages